The 1975 National Football League draft was held January 28–29, 1975, at the New York Hilton at Rockefeller Center in New York City, New York. With the first overall pick of the draft, the Atlanta Falcons selected quarterback Steve Bartkowski.

Player selections

Round one

Round two

Round three

Round four

Round five

Round six

Round seven

Round eight

Round nine

Round ten

Round eleven

Round twelve

Round thirteen

Round fourteen

Round fifteen

Round sixteen

Round seventeen

Hall of Famers
 Walter Payton, running back from Jackson State, taken 1st round 4th overall by Chicago Bears
Inducted: Professional Football Hall of Fame class of 1993.
 Randy White, defensive tackle from Maryland, taken 1st round 2nd overall by Dallas Cowboys
Inducted: Professional Football Hall of Fame class of 1994.
 Fred Dean, defensive end from Louisiana Tech, taken 2nd round 33rd overall by San Diego Chargers
Inducted: Professional Football Hall of Fame class of 2008.
 Robert Brazile, linebacker from Jackson State, taken 1st round 6th overall by Houston Oilers
Inducted: Professional Football Hall of Fame Class of 2018.

Notable undrafted players

References

External links
 NFL.com – 1975 Draft
 databaseFootball.com – 1975 Draft
 Pro Football Hall of Fame

National Football League Draft
NFL Draft
Draft
NFL Draft
NFL Draft
American football in New York City
1970s in Manhattan
Sporting events in New York City
Sports in Manhattan